Heaven Hill Distilleries, Inc. is a private, American family-owned and operated distillery founded in 1935 and headquartered in Bardstown, Kentucky, that produces and markets the Heaven Hill brand of Kentucky Straight Bourbon Whiskey and a variety of other distilled spirits. Its current distillery facility, called the Heaven Hill Bernheim distillery, is in Louisville, Kentucky. It is the seventh-largest alcohol supplier in the United States, the second-largest holder of bourbon whiskey inventory in the world, the largest, independent, family-owned and operated producer and marketer of distilled spirits in the United States, and the only large family-owned distillery company headquartered in Kentucky (not counting Brown-Forman Corporation, which is publicly traded but more than two-thirds family-controlled, or Sazerac Company, which is family-owned but headquartered in Louisiana).

History
Heaven Hill was founded by several investors shortly after the repeal of Prohibition in 1935, including a prominent distiller, Joseph L. Beam, and a member of the Shapira family. As the company developed, the five brothers of the Shapira family bought out the other investors. Joe Beam remained as Master Distiller, along with his youngest son, Harry. Descendants of the Shapira brothers own and operate the company today.

All of the Master Distillers at Heaven Hill since its founding have been members of the Beam family. The original Master Distiller was Joseph L. Beam, Jim Beam's first cousin. He was followed by his son, Harry, who was followed by Earl Beam, the son of Jim Beam's brother, Park. Earl Beam was succeeded by the current Master Distillers, Parker Beam and his son, Craig Beam.

The original name was "Old Heavenhill Springs" distillery.  The company was founded as a bourbon distillery, with a model focused on providing bulk whiskey for third parties on a basis of futures (a buyer would purchase fresh whiskey, to be held in Heaven Hill's warehouses until the buyer paid the government tax to have it released). It also focused on its flagship bourbon labels, Evan Williams and Elijah Craig. In the past two decades the company has expanded its portfolio, acquiring brands or obtaining import rights for gins, malt whiskey, vodkas, and other drinks.

On November 7, 1996, Heaven Hill's production plant (registered plant DSP-KY-31) was almost completely destroyed by fire. The fire started in an aging warehouse and spread to other buildings and vehicles. 90,000 barrels of flammable bourbon were consumed. A "river of fire" flowed from the warehouses. From one account of the fire: "Flames leapt hundreds of feet into the air and lit the sky throughout the night. Witnesses reported seeing whiskey barrels explode and rocket across the sky like shooting stars ... a two-mile long stretch of the creek that supplied process water to the distillery was set ablaze for a brief time."

The company survived the next several years through the provision of production capacity by its fellow local bourbon labels, Brown-Forman and Jim Beam, until its purchase and adaptation of the Bernheim distillery in Louisville (registered plant DSP-KY-1,) from Diageo in 1999. While fermenting, mashing, and distilling occurs at the new distillery, aging, bottling, and shipping still occur in Bardstown.

With the 2003 acquisition of distribution rights to Hpnotiq, Heaven Hill greatly expanded their product base beyond bourbon. Hpnotiq is now the fourth highest selling imported liqueur in the US. While bourbon is still its main focus, Heaven Hill now distributes a wide variety of different products.

The Heaven Hill company strongly emphasizes the history and traditions of bourbon in its public relations, highlighting the company's location in the historical home of bourbon-making and its status as the only such company still under local ownership. In 2004, the Heaven Hill Distilleries Bourbon Heritage Center was opened on the old distillery grounds, providing historical exhibits and guided tours of the plant. The company also hosts the annual Kentucky Bourbon Festival, and several of the company's brands are named after famous local distillers.

Since 2010, Heaven Hill has invested more than $100m in distillery expansions, warehouse construction, and Bourbon tourism. In November 2018, Heaven Hill announced a $65m multi-year investment into expanding operations, which includes a renovation of the Bourbon Heritage Center.

In September 2021, about 420 workers, all members of the United Food and Commercial Workers union, went on strike due to disagreements over the terms of a new labor contract.

Production process
Heaven Hill Bourbon is made from a mash composed of 78% corn, 10% rye, and 12% malted barley. The barrels used for aging have a #3 char.

Brands
As noted, Heaven Hill's traditional product has been bourbon; however, the company now oversees a broad range of labels. The company's labels include:

Bourbon brands

 Cabin Still Bourbon
 Echo Spring Bourbon
 Elijah Craig Bourbon
 Evan Williams Bourbon
 Fighting Cock Bourbon
 Heaven Hill Bourbon
 Henry McKenna Bourbon
 J.T.S. Brown Bourbon
 J.W. Dant Bourbon
 Kentucky Straight Bourbon
 Kentucky Supreme Bourbon
 Larceny Bourbon
 Old Fitzgerald Bourbon
 Private Cellar
 Parkers Heritage Collection
 T.W. Samuels Bourbon
 Virgin Bourbon

Other brands

 Admiral Nelson's Spiced Rum
 Ansac Cognac
 Arandas Tequila
 Aristocrat Vodka/Whiskey/Gin/Tequila (first marketed in 1991)
 Bernheim Original straight wheat whiskey
 Black Velvet  Canadian whisky
 Blackheart Premium Spiced Rum
 Burnett's Gin
 Burnett's Vodka
 Christian Brothers Brandy/Holiday Nog/Ports & Sherries
 Copa De Oro Coffee Liqueur
 Coronet VSQ
 Deep Eddy Vodka
 Du Bouchett
 Dubonnet
 Fulton's Harvest Pumpkin Pie Cream Liqueur
 Fulton's Harvest Apple Pie Cream Liqueur
 Georgia Moon corn whiskey
 Glen Salen Pure Malt Scotch Whisky
 Heaven Hill Kentucky Whiskey
 Hpnotiq Liqueur
 Isle of Jura Single Malt
 Kentucky Deluxe Blended Whiskey
 Lunazul
 Mellow Corn Kentucky Straight Corn Whiskey
 O'Mara's Irish Country Cream
 PAMA Pomegranate Liqueur
 Pikesville Straight Rye Whiskey
 Rittenhouse Straight Rye Whiskey
 Ron Leave Rum
 Two Fingers Tequila
 Whaler's Original Rum

See also
 List of Kentucky companies
 List of historic whisky distilleries

References

Bibliography

External links
 Official website
 Heaven Hill Distilleries Bourbon Heritage Center
 The Whisky Portal

Bourbon whiskey
Bardstown, Kentucky
Distilleries in Kentucky
Food and drink companies established in 1935
American companies established in 1935
1935 establishments in Kentucky
Alcoholic drink brands
Privately held companies based in Kentucky
Family-owned companies of the United States